Ibrahim Boubacar Marou (born 1 January 2000) is a Nigerien professional footballer who plays as a forward for Niger Premier League club AS FAN and the Niger national team.

References

External links 

 
 

2000 births
Living people
People from Tillabéri Region
Nigerien footballers
Association football forwards
ND Ilirija 1911 players
AS FAN players
Slovenian Second League players
Super Ligue (Niger) players
Niger youth international footballers
Niger international footballers
Nigerien expatriate footballers
Expatriate footballers in Slovenia
Nigerien expatriate sportspeople in Slovenia
Niger A' international footballers
2020 African Nations Championship players